Lee Seung-Bae (born May 10, 1971) was a South Korean amateur boxer, who won a middleweight bronze medal at the 1992 Summer Olympics for Korea, followed by a light heavyweight silver medal at the 1996 Summer Olympics.

Career

At the 1996 Summer Olympics, Lee captured the silver medal in light heavyweight. Lee lost to future IBF Cruiserweight Champion Vassili Jirov of Kazakhstan in the final bout. However, he beat Freddy Rojas of Cuba, who was the only fighter to hold a victory over Félix Savón, in round of 16, and defeated Stipe Drvis of Croatia, who became a WBA Light Heavyweight Champion in 2007, in the quarterfinal match.

Post career

In 2008, Lee earned doctorate in sports & physical education from Konkuk University. He is currently an assistant coach of the South Korea national amateur boxing team.

Results

External links
Boxrec profile

1971 births
Living people
Boxers at the 1992 Summer Olympics
Boxers at the 1996 Summer Olympics
Olympic boxers of South Korea
Olympic medalists in boxing
Asian Games medalists in boxing
Boxers at the 1994 Asian Games
Boxers at the 1998 Asian Games
South Korean male boxers
Medalists at the 1996 Summer Olympics
Medalists at the 1992 Summer Olympics
Asian Games gold medalists for South Korea
Asian Games silver medalists for South Korea
Olympic silver medalists for South Korea
Olympic bronze medalists for South Korea
Medalists at the 1994 Asian Games
Medalists at the 1998 Asian Games
Middleweight boxers
Konkuk University alumni